Allana Amy Slater (born 3 April 1984 in Perth, Western Australia) is a retired Australian artistic gymnast. The Australian senior all-around National Champion in 2000, 2003 and 2004 and a multiple medalist at the Commonwealth Games, Slater is considered to be one of Australia's most internationally successful gymnasts.

Early life and career
Allana Slater was born in Western Australia on 3 April 1984. She has a half-brother and -sister named Mark and Claire. Her father died in 1997 in a plane crash in Indonesia while she was competing in the Junior Pacific Alliance Championships.

Slater began gymnastics in a toddler program at Kalajos School of Gymnastics at 16 months of age, at the suggestion of a family doctor, who thought it would help treat her sleep apnea and increase her strength. When she was 5 years old, she was spotted by talent scouts from the Western Australian Institute of Sport (WAIS) and invited her to join their elite development program. She began training in the WAIS program just after her 6th birthday. Slater made her national competition debut at the age of 9 and her international debut at 11.

Senior career
1998 stands out as a breakthrough year for Slater. At a dual meet against Japan, while still a junior, she emerged as the all-around champion, recording her first major international victory over her more experienced teammates, in addition to the best gymnasts from Japan. A good performance at the World Youth Games followed and soon after a third-place finish at the Australian Commonwealth Games team trial. Slater soon found herself standing with her teammates at the podium in Kuala Lumpur receiving Australia's first ever Commonwealth Games team gold medal. Individually, Slater also won two silver medals in the all around and floor exercise finals.

Since then, Slater and her Australian teammates have truly made their mark on the international gymnastics scene. Their 5th-place finish at the 1999 World Championships (ahead of the US, who were the 1996 Olympic Champions) was a surprise to all but supporters of Australian gymnastics. At the same competition, Slater earned the highest place individual world ranking ever achieved by an Australian gymnast when she finished 9th in the individual all around.

In the most closely contested National Championship in Australian Gymnastics history, Slater pipped Trudy McIntosh with her last event to win her first National title early in 2000. In July of that year, at the Olympic Trials, Slater performed flawlessly to win the event, and in doing so assured herself of a place on her first Olympic team. Slater and the Australian girls performed well in the team competition to finish in 7th place - just missing the team final. Individually, Slater went on to compete in the individual all around where she finished in 16th place. She was also asked to join the Olympic medallists in performing in the post competition Gymnastics Gala.

Slater is also notable for being the gymnast who alerted officials to an equipment problem in the all-around final. Just before the third rotation, Slater, who was on vault in that rotation, realized that the vaulting horse seemed to be at the wrong height relative to her own stature and alerted her coach and the judges. Officials measured the apparatus and found that it had in fact been set 5 cm too low. The mistake was corrected and the gymnasts who had vaulted in the first two rotations were offered a do-over.

While all but one of her Olympic teammates left Sydney contemplating retirement, Slater continued to train and compete returning to Europe at the end of the year to take part in the last two events on the World Cup Circuit. At the DTB Cup, she made history winning Australia's first ever World Cup grand prix gold medal on the uneven bars, and also collected a silver medal on floor.

2002 started with a bang for Slater when she won her second World Cup Grand Prix gold medal at the Cottbus event on the floor in Germany. The Pacific Alliance Championships soon followed and Slater helped the Australian team to a strong silver medal performance as well as picking up an individual silver medal on the floor exercise. At the Australian Championships, she finished in second place overall just behind Alex Croak, and won three of the four individual apparatus titles. This event doubled as the first selection trial for the Commonwealth Games team, and after a month-long selection camp at the Australian Institute of Sport (AIS) in Canberra, Slater was named in her second Commonwealth Team. As it had been in 1998, the Australian team was a mixture of youth and experience. The team entered the competition in Manchester as hot favourites to defend the title they had won four years earlier, and did not disappoint. With a near perfect performance, the Australian girls won the team title by almost four points. Slater won four individual medals and returned home as one of the most successful Australian team members. She was selected as one of three athletes to represent the whole team in being welcomed home by the prime minister John Howard, a great honor for the gymnast. With the 2002 World Artistic Gymnastics Championships approaching quickly, there was barely time to celebrate. Slater was selected as Australia's only representative for the event after winning five gold medals at the selection trials.

Perhaps Slater's greatest achievement came in 2003 at the world championships in Anaheim. Here, she led the Australian team to the bronze medal, the first ever won by any Australian female gymnast at this level, and of course their highest team placing ever. The team beat such traditional gymnastics powerhouses as China (who would have won the bronze if not for a team deduction that was not based on actual performances), and Russia.

Slater competed in the 2004 Olympic Games in Athens, Greece, where she qualified for the balance beam final, but failed to medal after a fall from the beam. However, she continued to impress with her stylish gymnastics and choreography on floor. As one of the few gymnasts able to combine difficulty on the floor exercise with unique and stylish dance, she won many fans. She retired from gymnastics on 24 August 2005.

After gymnastics

After retirement Slater has gone on to do some television work in Australia, providing commentary for Australian cable television for some gymnastics events, as well as doing some television presenting work during the Australian coverage of the 2005 World Gymnastics Championships. Slater also had a cameo in the 2006 gymnastics film Stick It. In 2007 Slater took up pistol shooting.

Slater married Scott Penney in 2013; they have a son born in 2019. As of 2020 Slater works as a physiotherapist and a sonographer. Slater also currently serves on the WA Olympic Council.

References

External links
 
 
 
 
 
 

1984 births
Living people
Australian female artistic gymnasts
Gymnasts at the 2000 Summer Olympics
Gymnasts at the 2004 Summer Olympics
Olympic gymnasts of Australia
Medalists at the World Artistic Gymnastics Championships
People educated at Methodist Ladies' College, Perth
Sportswomen from Western Australia
Gymnasts at the 2002 Commonwealth Games
Gymnasts at the 1998 Commonwealth Games
Commonwealth Games gold medallists for Australia
Western Australian Institute of Sport alumni
Sportspeople from Perth, Western Australia
Commonwealth Games silver medallists for Australia
Commonwealth Games bronze medallists for Australia
Commonwealth Games medallists in gymnastics
21st-century Australian women
Medallists at the 1998 Commonwealth Games
Medallists at the 2002 Commonwealth Games